The Pucheng–Meizhou railway is a railway line in China.

History
Tracklaying between Jianning and Guanzhishan was completed in December 2020. The line had been expected to open in June 2021. The  section between Jianningxian and Guanzhishan opened on 30 September 2021.

References

Railway lines in China
Railway lines opened in 2021